The Treaty of Xàtiva was signed in 1244 between the Christian King James I of Aragon and the Muslim commander Abu Bakr in Xàtiva in the Iberian Peninsula. The treaty laid out generous terms of surrender of the Moors to the Christians, where the Moors were allowed to hold the Xativa Castle for two years before handing it over to the Christian monarchy.

See also
List of treaties

References

Warfare of the Middle Ages
Treaties of Al-Andalus
Xativa
Xativa
Jativa
Xativa
1244 in Europe
13th century in Aragon